Tasek Lama, also known as Kampong Tasek Lama is a neighbourhood in Brunei-Muara District, Brunei, as well as the capital Bandar Seri Begawan. The population was 827 in 2016. It is one of the villages within Mukim Kianggeh. The postcode is BA1611.

Tourism 

 Tasek Lama Recreational Park is a recreational park located within the village which consisted of a reservoir and waterfall.

See also 
 List of neighbourhoods in Bandar Seri Begawan

References 

Villages in Brunei-Muara District
Neighbourhoods in Bandar Seri Begawan